V. C. Govindasamy is an Indian politician and former Member of the Legislative Assembly of Tamil Nadu. He was elected to the Tamil Nadu legislative assembly from Kaveripattinam constituency as a Dravida Munnetra Kazhagam candidate in 1971, and 1989 elections.

Also he was a District Chairman of Agricultural Marketing Committee from 2007 to 2011

He is a "Mozhipoar Thiyagi" against Hindi, celebrating by party every year 25 January.

References 

Dravida Munnetra Kazhagam politicians
Living people
Year of birth missing (living people)
Tamil Nadu MLAs 1971–1976